, also known as his Chinese style name , was a bureaucrat of the Ryukyu Kingdom.

Ishadō served as a member of Sanshikan from 1821 to 1828.

References

1776 births
1842 deaths
Ueekata
Sanshikan
People of the Ryukyu Kingdom
Ryukyuan people
18th-century Ryukyuan people
19th-century Ryukyuan people